Bygdsiljum is a locality situated in Skellefteå Municipality, Västerbotten County, Sweden with 333 inhabitants in 2015.

It is situated at the outlet of Västerbotten's biggest lake, Bygdeträsket, 20 km from the coast and 1 hour by car from the cities of Skellefteå and Umeå.

The town's economy is mostly built on farming, light industry and lumber.

References

External links
 
Official site (Swedish)

Populated places in Västerbotten County
Populated places in Skellefteå Municipality